Andrés Pérez (died 1583) was a Roman Catholic prelate who served as Bishop of Ciudad Rodrigo (1568–1583).

Biography
On 10 Dec 1568, Andrés Pérez was appointed during the papacy of Pope Pius V as Bishop of Ciudad Rodrigo.
In 1569, he was consecrated bishop.
He served as Bishop of Ciudad Rodrigo until his death in 1583.

References

External links and additional sources
 (for Chronology of Bishops) 
 (for Chronology of Bishops) 

16th-century Roman Catholic bishops in Spain
Bishops appointed by Pope Pius V
1583 deaths